Eitea was a deme of ancient Attica, of the phyle of Antiochis.

Its site is located near modern Grammatiko.

References

Populated places in ancient Attica
Former populated places in Greece
Demoi